KHRO (1150 kHz) is a commercial AM radio station in El Paso, Texas. This station is owned by Entravision Communications.  Its studio facilities are located on North Mesa Street/Highway 20 in northwest El Paso.  The transmitter is located east of downtown in Ascarate Park, near Texas State Highway Loop 375.  KHRO simulcasts the radio format heard on sister station KOFX 92.3 FM.

History
The station first signed on in June 1958 as KIZZ.  It was owned by Coronado Broadcasters and was a CBS Radio Network affiliate.  The station originally was a daytimer, powered at 1,000 watts, and required to sign off at sunset to avoid interfering with other stations on AM 1150.  In the 1980s, it was given Federal Communications Commission (FCC) permission to broadcast around the clock, using 380 watts during nighttime hours.  In the 1990s, the daytime power was boosted to 5,000 watts.

The station has gone through numerous formats over the years, including oldies, adult contemporary music, talk and Regional Mexican music.

Expanded Band assignment

On March 17, 1997 the FCC announced that 88 stations had been given permission to move to newly available "Expanded Band" transmitting frequencies, from 1610 to 1700 kHz. The then-KSVE was authorized to move from 1150 kHz to 1650 kHz.

The expanded band operation on 1650 kHz was assigned the call letters KBIV on September 4, 1998, which were changed to KHRO on February 25, 2005, and to KSVE on September 23, 2008.

The FCC initially provided that both the original station and its expanded band counterpart could optionally operate simultaneously for up to five years, after which owners would have to turn in one of the two licenses, depending on whether they preferred the new assignment or elected to remain on the original frequency. However, this deadline has been extended multiple times, and both KHRO on 1150 kHz and KSVE on 1650 kHz have remained authorized. One restriction is that the FCC has generally required paired original and expanded band stations to remain under common ownership.

References

External links

HRO
Radio stations established in 1958
1958 establishments in Texas
Classic hits radio stations in the United States
Entravision Communications stations